Samantha Smith (born April 1, 1992) is a Canadian trampoline gymnast from Vancouver, British Columbia. Samantha is the reigning Pan American Games Champion having won gold in 2019 in Lima, Peru. She has competed at every Trampoline Gymnastics World Championships from 2010 to 2019.

At the 2019 Trampoline World Championships held in Tokyo, Japan, she won, alongside Sophiane Méthot, Sarah Milette and Rosie MacLennan, the bronze medal in the women's team event with a score of 133.745.

Smith competed at the 2020 Summer Olympics.

She is Jewish.

See also
List of Jews in sports

References

External links
 
 

1992 births
Living people
Canadian female trampolinists
Gymnasts at the 2019 Pan American Games
Gymnasts at the 2020 Summer Olympics
Gymnasts from Toronto
Jewish Canadian sportspeople
Medalists at the 2019 Pan American Games
Pan American Games gold medalists for Canada
Pan American Games medalists in gymnastics
Sportspeople from Vancouver
20th-century Canadian women
21st-century Canadian women